Arbela is a genus of bugs in the Nabidae family.

There are presently approx. 20 species in this genus, most of them from the Oriental region and 3 species from Africa.

Species
Some species of this genus are:
Arbela acutistriata  Mell 1923
Arbela baibarana  Matsumura 1927
Arbela carayoni  Kerzhner, 1986 (Africa)
Arbela confusa  Harris, 1938  (Africa)
Arbela costalis Stål, 1873
Arbela elegantula  Stål 1866 (Africa)
Arbela formosana  Matsumura 1921
Arbela hibisci  Esaki & Ishihara 1943
Arbela lemkaminensis  Kerzhner 1970
Arbela limbata  Kerzhner 1970
Arbela nitidula  Stal
Arbela obliquifasciata  Mell 1923
Arbela peterseni  Kerzhner 1970
Arbela pulchella  Hsiao 1981
Arbela sophiae  Kerzhner 1969
Arbela szechuana  Hsiao 1964
Arbela tabida  (Uhler 1896)
Arbela yunnana  Hsiao

References 

 Harris, 1938. The genus Arbela Stal (Hemiptera: Nabidae). Annals and Magazine of Natural History 1:561-584

Nabidae
Cimicomorpha genera